Lucia St. Clair Robson is an American historical novelist. She was married to science fiction novelist Brian Daley. She is a 1982 recipient of the Spur Award for Best Novel of the West.

Works
Last Train from Cuernavaca - inspired by two very different women, one Zapotec and one English, who participated in the Mexican Revolution.
Shadow Patriots -  The story of a group that spied for George Washington, including a woman known only as "355"
Ghost Warrior - The story of the Apaches and Lozen, revered warrior and shaman.
Ride the Wind -  Cynthia Ann Parker's life with the Comanches.
The Tokaido Road -  A chase up the fabled Tokaido Road, set against the backdrop of feudal Japan's most famous event, the revenge of the forty-seven ronin.
Mary's Land - A novel of the rowdy Maryland frontier of 1638.
Fearless, A Novel of Sarah Bowman -  Six-foot-tall laundress, Sarah Bowman, makes a name for herself in the Mexican War.
Walk in My Soul -  A fictional account of young Sam Houston's life with the Cherokee Indians and with their Beloved Woman, Tiana Rogers.
Light a Distant Fire -  Osceola and his beleaguered people fight the U.S. Army to a standstill in the swamps of Florida in 1840.
"A Chance of a Ghost" short story in Twilight Zone: 19 Original Stories on the 50th Anniversary

References

External links

Talking with...Lucia St. Clair Robson, by John Coyne, Peace Corps Writers.
Novelist Taps History for Story Set in 17th Century Maryland by L. Peat O'Neil, Washington Post, September 14, 1995.

Living people
20th-century American novelists
21st-century American novelists
American women novelists
American historical novelists
Novelists from Florida
Year of birth missing (living people)
20th-century American women writers
21st-century American women writers
Women historical novelists